Riichi Arai (born 16 August 1933) is a Japanese basketball player. He competed in the men's tournament at the 1956 Summer Olympics.

References

External links

1933 births
Living people
Japanese men's basketball players
Olympic basketball players of Japan
Basketball players at the 1956 Summer Olympics
Asian Games medalists in basketball
Asian Games bronze medalists for Japan
Basketball players at the 1954 Asian Games
Medalists at the 1954 Asian Games